Kokrajhar West Assembly constituency is one of the 126 constituencies of the Assam Legislative Assembly in India. Kokrajhar West forms a part of the Kokrajhar Lok Sabha constituency.

Members of Legislative Assembly 
 1967: Ranendra Narayan Basumatary, Indian National Congress
 1972: Charan Narzary, Plain Tribals Council of Assam
 1978: Ranendra Narayan Basumatary, Indian National Congress
 1983: Ranendra Narayan Basumatary, Indian National Congress
 1985: Amrit Lal Basumatary, Indian Congress (Socialist)
 1991: Parameswar Brahma, Independent
 1996: Hemendra Nath Brahma, Independent
 2001: Hemendra Nath Brahma, Independent
 2006: Parameswar Brahma, Independent
 2011: Pradip Kumar Brahma, Bodoland People's Front
 2016: Rabiram Narzary, Bodoland People's Front
 2021: Rabiram Narzary, Bodoland People's Front

See also
List of constituencies of the Assam Legislative Assembly

References

External links 
 

Assembly constituencies of Assam
Kokrajhar